Flying Officer Anthony Watson-Gandy (29 June 1919 – 27 June 1952) was a scholar and Denham Fouts's last lover, the one who was taking care of him at the time of his death in Rome.

Biography
Anthony Blethyn (or Blethwyn) Watson-Gandy was born on 29 June 1919. He was the son of Major William Donald Paul Watson-Gandy (1872-1947) and Annis Vere Gandy (b. 1884). 

He was educated at Westminster School, London, entering in 1933. He then went to King's College, Cambridge University. He also attended the Sorbonne University, Paris.

He fought in the World War II. He gained the rank of Flying Officer in the Royal Air Force.

After WWII he was in Rome with Denham Fouts. Fouts spent much of his later life dissolute, spending time "in bed like a corpse, sheet to his chin, a cigarette between his lips turning to ash. His lover, Anthony Watson-Gandy, a writer and translator, would remove the cigarette just before it burned his lips." Fouts died in 1948. 

After the death of Fouts, Watson-Gandy went to live in Macao with a Chinese boyfriend, smoking opium and studying Mandarin. He translated from French The Rise and Splendour of the Chinese Empire (1952) by René Grousset.

He died on 27 June 1952 in London.

References

1919 births
1952 deaths